Cadacross was a Finnish melodic death metal band formed in 1997. They went through a major line-up change after their debut album So Pale Is the Light. Georg Laakso, guitarist and vocalist, was the only remaining member from the previous lineup. By Cadacross' second album Corona Borealis, their sound had become more distinctive and had more in common with such bands as Turisas and other Finnish viking and folk metal bands.

End of band
On October 27, 2005, Laakso was incapacitated after a motoring accident that caused injuries to his spinal cord, and brought about the end of Cadacross and the career of Laakso as guitarist for Turisas. Since then Georg Laakso has been making music in his home studio.

Line-up

Current
Sami Aarnio – vocals (see also Turisas)
Georg Laakso – guitar/vocals (see also Turisas)
Tino Ahola – guitar
Jukka-Pekka Miettinen]] – bass (see also Arthemesia)
Antti Ventola – keyboard (see also Turisas)
Nina Laakso – backing vocals
Kimmo Miettinen – drums (see also Arthemesia)

Past members
Tommi Saari – guitar
Jarkko Lemmetty – bass
Mathias Nygård – keyboards
Janne Salo – drums

Additional musicians (Corona Borealis)
 Riku Ylitalo – accordion
 Jari Mäenpää – guitar
 Jukka Salo – vocals

Discography

Albums
 So Pale Is the Light (2001)
 Corona Borealis (2002)

Demos
 Power of the Night (1997)
 Bloody Way (1998)

References

External links
Official Website
BNR Metal
Myspace fanpage

Finnish heavy metal musical groups
Finnish folk metal musical groups
Finnish melodic death metal musical groups
Finnish power metal musical groups
Musical groups established in 1997
Musical groups disestablished in 2005
Musical quartets